Royal Challengers Bangalore were one of the ten teams that took part in the 2011 Indian Premier League. They were captained by former New Zealand skipper Daniel Vettori and coached by Ray Jennings. They finished as runners-up of the tournament after losing to Chennai Super Kings in the final. With this, they qualified for the 2011 Champions League Twenty20, where they again finished runners-up after losing the final to the Mumbai Indians.

Background

Royal Challengers had reached the semifinals in the 2010 edition of the IPL where they were defeated by the Mumbai Indians. They qualified for the 2010 Champions League Twenty20 as the third IPL team after beating Deccan Chargers in the qualification match. After a decent run in the CLT20, they were defeated by the Chennai Super Kings in the semifinals by 52 runs.

The 2010 season was also the last for their skipper Anil Kumble who had planned to retire from all forms of cricket. Kumble had taken over the captaincy from Rahul Dravid in 2009, after the team's poor showing in 2008, and led them to the finals in 2009 and semifinals in 2010.

Pre-season player signings
With the addition of two more teams in the IPL for the 2011 season, it was declared by the IPL Governing Council that each franchise can retain a maximum of four players of their squad for the 2011 season, only three of whom can be Indian players, and the rest of the international players would be put in the mega-auction. The spending power for each franchise at the mega-auction was restricted to $9 million. The player retention clause also stated that if a franchise decides to retain four players, $4.5 million will be charged, leaving the franchise with only $4.5 million to spend at the auction.

The Royal Challengers retained only one player, Virat Kohli, for a price of $1.8 million, thus leaving them with $7.2 million to spend at the players auction. At the auction, they bought several top international cricketers like AB de Villiers, Daniel Vettori, Tillakaratne Dilshan, Zaheer Khan and Dirk Nannes. The most expensive buy at the auction, however, was Saurabh Tiwary who had an impressive 2010 IPL season with the Mumbai Indians, as he went for $1.6 million. Other Indian players bought at the auction include Cheteshwar Pujara, Mohammed Kaif and Abhimanyu Mithun.

The team management received a lot of criticism from the supporters at not retaining several top Twenty20 players like Jacques Kallis, Rahul Dravid, Kevin Pietersen, Dale Steyn, Ross Taylor and Robin Uthappa, who were instrumental in the team's success in the previous two seasons.

Two weeks into the start of IPL, fast bowler Dirk Nannes was injured and ruled out of the tournament. The franchise named Chris Gayle, who had gone unsold at the auction, as the replacement player.

List of players bought at the auction

Squad 
Players with international caps before the start of 2011 IPL season are listed in bold.

Indian Premier League

RCB kicked off their campaign with a comfortable six-wicket win over the newly formed team, Kochi Tuskers Kerala. But then they suffered three big defeats at the hands of Mumbai Indians, Deccan Chargers and Chennai Super Kings. At this stage, speedster Dirk Nannes was ruled out of the tournament and RCB team management named West Indian opener Chris Gayle as his replacement. Gayle started off the tournament with a century (102* off 55 balls) against Kolkata Knight Riders, giving the Challengers an emphatic 9-wicket win. RCB also managed to beat Delhi Daredevils and Pune Warriors in their next two matches. They went on to beat Kings XI Punjab by a big margin of 85 runs, after Gayle smashed his second century of the tournament (107 off 49 balls). They won their next two matches against Kochi and Rajasthan Royals, both comprehensively by 9 wickets. They also defeated Kolkata in a rain-affected match at Bangalore. But then, Kings XI Punjab, riding on a blistering hundred by their skipper Adam Gilchrist, ended RCB's 7-match winning streak, with a huge 111-run margin win. In their last league match, the Challengers beat the defending champions Chennai Super Kings by 8 wickets to end at the top of the points table. Chris Gayle shining once again with the bat, scoring an unbeaten 75 off 50 balls.

Royal Challengers faced Chennai Super Kings in the 1st qualifier at Mumbai. Virat Kohli scored an unbeaten 70 off just 44 balls to help RCB put up 175/4 in their 20 overs. Despite losing early wickets, Chennai went on to win the match by 6 wickets. The win took Chennai to the final and RCB faced Mumbai Indians in the 2nd qualifier in Chennai. Batting first, Royal Challengers made a massive 185/4 in 20 overs on a slow Chepauk track. Chris Gayle was the star once again for them as he scored a blistering 89 runs off 47 balls. Mumbai never looked in the hunt for a win as they collapsed to a 43-run defeat. The Royal Challengers qualified for the finals with this win and went on to face Chennai at their home ground in the finals. Winning the toss, Chennai elected to bat first in the finals. The Super Kings posted a huge total of 205/5. The Challengers did not bat well and lost the match by 58 runs. Chris Gayle was named Man of the Tournament and Bangalore set a new IPL record for the most successive wins by winning 7 matches on the trot.

League table

Match log

Most runs

Most wickets

Champions League Twenty20
Royal Challengers Bangalore qualified for the main event of the 2011 Champions League Twenty20 as they finished runners-up in the 2011 Indian Premier League, this made the Challengers the first and only team ever to play in all the three seasons of the tournament. The Challengers, placed in Group B in the first round of the tournament, kicked of their quest for glory with a last-ball defeat to the Warriors. They suffered a big 9-wicket defeat at the hands of IPL counterparts Kolkata Knight Riders in their second group match, leaving them with two must-win matches in order to qualify for the semi-finals. They registered their first win in the competition, in emphatic manner, by beating Somerset by 51 runs, thanks to Chris Gayle's 46-ball 86. The win also consolidated their poor net run-rate. In their last group match, they faced the champions from Australia, the Southern Redbacks. Batting first, the Redbacks rode on a century by Daniel Harris (108* from 61 balls) to set RCB a target of 215. The Royal Challengers came out with a spirited batting performance with Tillakaratne Dilshan and Virat Kohli scoring half-centuries. However, the Redbacks hampered the run-chase by picking up wickets at regular stages towards the end of the innings. With six runs required off the last ball to win the match, RCB found an unlikely-hero in Arun Karthik, who struck Daniel Christian for a six over deep mid-wicket, to take RCB through to the semi-finals. The Challengers, despite being level on points with Kolkata Knight Riders and Warriors, qualified for the semis on basis of having a better net run-rate than the two teams.

The Royal Challengers played the New South Wales Blues in the semi-finals of the tournament. Winning the toss, Daniel Vettori put the Blues in to bat and the decision seemed to backfire as the Blues amassed 203/2 in 20 overs, mainly due to the efforts of David Warner who struck an unbeaten 123 off just 68 balls. Despite losing Dilshan early in the chase, RCB got off to a rollicking start with Chris Gayle smashing 92 runs from only 41 deliveries. He was ably supported by Kohli, who struck an unbeaten 84 from 49 balls to give RCB a comfortable 6-wicket victory with 9 balls to spare.

They took on an injury-hit Mumbai Indians in the final at Chennai. Mumbai winning the toss, chose to bat and put up a modest total of 139 in 20 overs. After getting off to a blistering start with the bat, the Challengers lost wickets at regular intervals before getting bundled out for 108 in 19.2 overs, falling short of the target by 31 runs. Mumbai skipper Harbhajan Singh was awarded the Man of the Match for picking 3/20 in his four overs.

Group table

Match log

Most runs

Most wickets

References

2011 Indian Premier League
Royal Challengers Bangalore seasons
2010s in Bangalore